The initialism OMSA may stand for:

 Ogden Museum of Southern Art
 OpenManage Server Administrator, a component of Dell Computer's OpenManage monitoring and management product for servers
  Online Master of Science in Analytics in Georgia Institute of Technology
 Otago Malaysian Students' Association